Constituency WR-21 is a reserved seat for women in the Khyber Pakhtunkhwa Assembly.

See also
 Constituency PK-31 (Swabi-I)
 Constituency PK-32 (Swabi-II)
 Constituency PK-33 (Swabi-III)
 Constituency PK-34 (Swabi-IV)
 Constituency PK-35 (Swabi-V)
 Constituency PK-36 (Swabi-VI)
 Constituency WR-19

References

Khyber Pakhtunkhwa Assembly constituencies